Roy Lars Magnus Boe (September 14, 1929 – June 7, 2009) was an owner of the New Jersey Nets, New York Islanders, and several other professional sports teams.

Boe was a graduate of Yale University and a veteran of the Korean War. With his first wife, Deon Woolfolk, he founded a successful women's clothing company called Boe Jests, and sold it for several million dollars in 1966. He bought his first sports team, the Westchester Bulls of the Atlantic Coast Football League, in 1968.

In 1969, Boe purchased the New York Nets of the American Basketball Association. During his tenure with the Nets, the team reached the ABA Finals in 1972, 1974, and 1976, winning the latter two series. After the last championship, Boe oversaw the Nets' entry into the National Basketball Association as part of the ABA–NBA merger. However, the New York Knicks demanded that the Nets pay them $4.8 million as compensation for "invading" the New York area.  This was on top of the $3.2 million the Nets had to pay for joining the league.  Boe offered to trade Julius Erving to the Knicks in return for waiving the indemnity, but the Knicks refused that offer.  With Erving demanding a reworked contract, Boe was forced to sell Erving to the Philadelphia 76ers—in essence, trading his franchise player for a berth in the NBA, a move for which he was harshly criticized.  Boe moved the team to New Jersey before the 1977–78 season, and sold the team in 1978.

In 1972, Boe helped found the New York Islanders of the National Hockey League. He owned twenty percent of the team and hired Bill Torrey as the team's general manager. Shortly after Boe sold his share of the team to John O. Pickett in 1978, Torrey led the Islanders to four consecutive Stanley Cup victories.

In his later years, Boe owned the Worcester Ice Cats and Bridgeport Sound Tigers of the American Hockey League. He died of heart failure on June 7, 2009, and was survived by his wife, Betty Broderick, five children, and six grandchildren.

References

1929 births
2009 deaths
American Basketball Association executives
American military personnel of the Korean War
National Hockey League owners
New Jersey Nets owners
New York Islanders executives
Yale University alumni